Thomas Hampson (28 October 1907 – 4 September 1965) was an English athlete, winner of the 800 metres at the 1932 Summer Olympics and the first man to run 800 metres in under 1 minute 50 seconds.

Hampson, a native of Clapham (London), didn't take up running seriously until the last year of his studies at Oxford University. After completing his education, he became a teacher in 1930 (at St Albans School). That same year, he won the British AAA championships over 880 yd (805 m), a title he would also claim in 1931 and 1932.

Also a winner at the inaugural British Empire Games, Hampson was one of the world's leading runners in the 800 m and half-mile event. That made him one of the top favourites for the 800 m gold at the 1932 Olympics, held in Los Angeles. In the final, Hampson fought off Canadian Alex Wilson to break the tape in 1.49.7, a new world record.

He added a second Olympic medal with the British 4 × 400 metres relay team, which came second to the United States. Hampson ended his sports career later that year. Several years later, he left his teaching job to become an educator in the Royal Air Force, a job he kept until after World War II.

In 1954, Hampson moved to Stevenage, Hertfordshire, and joined the Stevenage Development Corporation as Social Relations Officer. He was a warden at the church of St Mary in the town, and after he died at the age of 57, he was buried there. Hampson Park in the town was later named after him.

References

External links
 

1907 births
1965 deaths
People from Clapham
English male middle-distance runners
English Olympic medallists
Olympic athletes of Great Britain
Olympic gold medallists for Great Britain
Olympic silver medallists for Great Britain
Olympic gold medalists in athletics (track and field)
Olympic silver medalists in athletics (track and field)
Athletes (track and field) at the 1932 Summer Olympics
Medalists at the 1932 Summer Olympics
Commonwealth Games gold medallists for England
Commonwealth Games medallists in athletics
Athletes (track and field) at the 1930 British Empire Games
World record setters in athletics (track and field)
Royal Air Force personnel of World War II
Medallists at the 1930 British Empire Games